Steven Mead (born 1962 in Bournemouth, England) is an English virtuoso euphonium soloist and teacher who has played an important role in achieving worldwide recognition of the instrument. He has played solo concerti with many symphony orchestras, including: the Stuttgart Philharmonic Orchestra, the Trondheim Symphony Orchestra, Lahti Symphony Orchestra and Helsinki Philharmonic, Capella Cracoviensis, the Minneapolis Pops Orchestra and the Japan Chamber Orchestra. He has premiered works by Martin Ellerby, Torstein Aagaard-Nilsen, Vladimir Cosma, Goff Richards, John Reeman, Rolf Rudin and Philip Sparke, amongst others.  Goff Richards' Pilatus, Aagaard-Nilsen's Concerto for Euphonium and Orchestra, Reeman's Sonata for Euphonium and Ellerby's Euphonium Concerto were all written expressly for Mead.

Selected recordings

Joseph Horovitz: Four Concertos
Ensemble: Royal Ballet Sinfonia; Soloists: Andrew Haveron (violin), Steven Mead (euphonium), David Owen Norris (piano); Conductor Joseph Horovitz; Label: Dutton Epoch.
Concertino
Ensemble: The Lillestrøm Musikkorps; Soloist: Steven Mead (euphonium); Conductor Gert Buitenhuis; Label: Polyphonic.
Euphonium Virtuoso
Ensemble: Brass Band Buizingen; Soloist: Steven Mead (euphonium); Conductor: Luc Vertommen; Label: Bocchino.
Dreamscapes: Wind Music by Ellerby, Clarke & Josephs
Ensemble: Royal Northern College of Music Wind Orchestra; Soloist: Steven Mead (euphonium); Conductor: James Gourlay; Label: Polyphonic.
Audacious
Soloist: Steven Mead; Accompanied by Tomoko Sawano, piano; Label: Bocchino.
Fandango, released 1 June 2011; Accompanied by Tomoko Sawano, piano; Label: Bocchino.

References

Rachel Dunlap, Mead to perform world-class talents on obscure brass instrument, Spectator Eau Claire, January 25, 2001. Accessed 10 September 2008.
Ronald Holz, Review: Euphonium Virtuoso (Bocchino CD BOCC107), The Brass Band Bridge, North American Brass Band Association, Issue 101, October 2006. pp. 21–22. Accessed 10 September 2008.
Steven Mead biography on the Besson company web site. Accessed 10 September 2008.

External links 
 
 Video of a live unedited performance, most of the third movement of the Hallows Concerto (Rolf Rudin) in a performance given by Steven at The Capitol Theatre, Offenbach, on Sunday 15 March 2009, with the Neue Philharmonie Orchestra, conductor Roland Böer

English classical musicians
Euphonium players
1962 births
Living people
Musicians from Bournemouth